MP

Supriya Sule (née Pawar; born 30 June 1969) is an Indian politician from the Nationalist Congress Party and currently a Member of Parliament (MP) in the 17th Lok Sabha representing Baramati. She previously served as an MP in the 15th and 16th Lok Sabhas.

In 2011, she launched a statewide campaign against female foeticide. Recently, she has been honored with Mumbai Women of the Decade Achievers Award by All Ladies League for social service.

Early life

Sule was born to Indian politician and Nationalist Congress Party founder Sharad Pawar and his wife Pratibha Pawar on 30 June 1969 in Pune. She was educated at Jai Hind College in Mumbai, earning a B.Sc. degree in microbiology from INDIA

Political Career

Sule was elected to the Rajya Sabha in the September 2006 intake from Maharashtra and is a trustee of the Nehru Centre in Mumbai.

She led the state level campaign against female foeticide. The campaign included padayatras, college events, competitions etc.

In 2012, under the leadership of Sule, the wing named Rashtravadi Yuvati Congress was formed to give platform to young girls in politics. For past several months, several rallies have been organised all over Maharashtra which focused on female fetus abortion, dowry system and women empowerment in general.

Sule is known for her exemplary parliamentary engagement as a member of the Lok Sabha, with her emerging as one of the Best Performers In Lok Sabha on multiple occasions.

IPL allegations
In April 2010, Sule denied allegations of financial links between her family and the Indian Premier League (IPL), when reports on IPL irregularities in its ownership and functioning surfaced and led India's Minister of State for External Affairs to resign. However, there were reports that her husband owned (via a power of attorney from his father) 10% of a firm that had exclusive multi-year broadcasting rights for IPL matches.

In June 2010, The Economic Times, India's largest business newspaper, reported that Sharad Pawar and Supriya Sule owned 16.22 percent of a firm that had bid for the Pune franchise of IPL. She had previously stated, "I say with full conviction that my husband or my family has nothing to do with these issues (the IPL bids) ... We always stay miles away from it. Yes, we are avid cricket watchers, my husband, my kids, my family, all, and that's where the buck stops." When challenged on this, she said she was just a minority shareholder and cannot be responsible for the firm's actions.

Personal life
She married Sadanand Bhalchandra Sule on 4 March 1991. They have one son - Vijay and one daughter - Revati.
After marriage, she spent some time in California, where she studied water pollution at UC Berkeley. Subsequently, she moved to Indonesia and Singapore and then returned to Mumbai.

References

External links
 
Profile on Lok Sabha website
 
 
 

1969 births
Living people
People from Baramati
Politicians from Pune
Nationalist Congress Party politicians from Maharashtra
Maharashtra politicians
Women in Maharashtra politics
Marathi politicians
Jai Hind College alumni
Rajya Sabha members from Maharashtra
Lok Sabha members from Maharashtra
India MPs 2009–2014
India MPs 2014–2019
India MPs 2019–present
Women members of the Rajya Sabha
Women members of the Lok Sabha
21st-century Indian politicians
21st-century Indian women politicians